The Liberian Journal (TLJ), a US-based Liberian online news site, covers issues of interest to Liberians in the Diaspora, including developments in post-conflict Liberia. It also publishes news about Africa and many defining events around the world. It provides news and information on developments in the spheres of politics, economics, sports, health, entertainment, and other areas.

History
Established April 8, 2008, the Minnesota-based Liberian news outfit also publishes about 15,000 free copies of monthly print newspapers.

Published and edited by Abdullah Kiatamba, a Liberian activist and writer, includes contributions by Liberian writers, including exiled Liberian journalists and U.S-trained news reporters and editors. TLJ’s list of writers also includes Liberian scholars, professors, women leaders, activists, and many non-Liberians.

The Liberian Journal today
The Liberian Journal has interviewed several people linked to Liberia, including President Ellen Johnson-Sirleaf, Vice-President Joseph Boakai, presidential candidate George Weah, and other Liberian Diaspora leaders.

References

External links
Official site

Newspapers published in Minnesota
2008 establishments in Minnesota